In scheduling, tardiness is a measure of a delay in executing certain operations and earliness is a measure of finishing operations before due time. The operations may depend on each other and on the availability of equipment to perform them.

Typical examples include job scheduling in manufacturing and data delivery scheduling in data processing networks.

In manufacturing environment, inventory management considers both tardiness and earliness undesirable. Tardiness involves backlog issues such as customer compensation for delays and loss of goodwill. Earliness incurs expenses for storage of the manufactured items and ties up capital.

Mathematical formulations

In an environment with multiple jobs, let the deadline be  and the completion time be  of job . Then for  job 

The weight is a representation of job cost, priority, etc.

In a large number of cases the problems of optimizing these functions are NP-hard.

References

Time management
Scheduling (computing)
Schedule (project management)
Theoretical computer science